Sterling Price Strong (August 17, 1862 – March 28, 1936) was a U.S. Representative from Texas.

Born on a farm near Jefferson City, Missouri, Strong moved to Texas in 1871 with his parents, who settled in Montague County.
He attended the rural schools of Montague County, Texas, and was graduated from Eastman's National Business College, Poughkeepsie, New York, in 1884.
County clerk of Montague County 1884-1888 and 1898-1904.
Engrossing clerk of the State senate in 1889.
County and district clerk of Hale County 1889-1892.
Traveling salesman 1892-1898 and 1911-1932.
Cashier in the National Bank of Bowie, Texas from 1908 to 1911.
He served as member of Texas State Democratic executive committee 1900-1902.
He was an unsuccessful candidate for Lieutenant Governor of Texas in 1930.

Strong was elected at-large as a Democrat to the Seventy-third Congress (March 4, 1933 – January 3, 1935).
He was an unsuccessful candidate for renomination in 1934.
He died in Dallas on March 28, 1936 and was interred in Old Oak Cliff Cemetery.

Sources

External links 
 

1862 births
1936 deaths
Democratic Party members of the United States House of Representatives from Texas